Judit Kiss (born 27 January 1980) is a Hungarian swimmer. She competed at the 1992 Summer Olympics and the 1996 Summer Olympics.

References

External links
 

1980 births
Living people
Hungarian female swimmers
Olympic swimmers of Hungary
Swimmers at the 1992 Summer Olympics
Swimmers at the 1996 Summer Olympics
People from Veszprém
Sportspeople from Veszprém County